Alfred Powell may refer to:
 Alfred H. Powell (1781–1831), American politician
 Alfred Hoare Powell (1865–1960), English architect and designer
 Alfred Powell (cricketer) (1908–1985), English cricketer
 Jay Powell (politician) (Alfred J. Powell Jr., 1952–2019), member of the legislature of the U.S. State of Georgia